Fernando Monetti (born 21 February 1989 in La Plata, Argentina) is an Argentine footballer who plays as a goalkeeper. He currently plays for Argentine team Club Atlético Lanús.

Career
He was the first choice keeper for Gimnasia La Plata from 2010 until 2015.

References

Living people
1989 births
Argentine footballers
Argentine expatriate footballers
Association football goalkeepers
Argentine Primera División players
Primera Nacional players
Categoría Primera A players
Club de Gimnasia y Esgrima La Plata footballers
Club Atlético Lanús footballers
Atlético Nacional footballers
San Lorenzo de Almagro footballers
Argentine expatriate sportspeople in Colombia
Expatriate footballers in Colombia
Footballers from La Plata